Labrador is a district of the San Mateo canton, in the Alajuela province of Costa Rica.

History 
Labrador was created on 6 August 2012 by Acuerdo Ejecutivo N° 37-2012-MGP.

Geography 
Labrador has an area of  km² and an elevation of  metres.

Demographics 

For the 2011 census, Labrador had a population of  inhabitants.

Transportation

Road transportation 
The district is covered by the following road routes:
 National Route 131
 National Route 755

References 

Districts of Alajuela Province
Populated places in Alajuela Province